Guitarchitecture is a term developed by Chuck Hammer in 1977, describing an approach to soundtrack composition, employing discrete textured guitar layers.

The core idea behind Guitarchitecture: "to expand the guitar's sonic vocabulary", is contextual and process based:

The Roland GR 500 Guitar/synthesizer allowed partial - "infinite sustain" through the use of a built in magnetic field sustainer.

This "sustainer" radically altered the temporal properties of guitar string response, extending its basic physical sonic capabilities.

As the instrument could now sustain single notes and chords almost "infinitely", the music that could now be conceived and rendered with a guitar were widely reconsidered.

The ideas and concepts surrounding Guitarchitecture were gaining strength while Chuck Hammer  toured live with a GR 500 Guitar Synth with Lou Reed 1978–1980. During this time, Hammer began recording a series of experimental Guitar Synth multi tracks for RCA, Epic, and Atlantic Records.  These early Guitarchitecture soundtracks were eventually sent to David Bowie in an effort to raise their profile.
This eventually led to the recording of seminal guitar synth tracks for David Bowie's album Scary Monsters (And Super Creeps), released in September 1980 by RCA Records, which included four layered guitar synth tracks on "Ashes to Ashes".

External links
Guitarchitecture Official Site

Guitars